Fuling Arch Bridge is a concrete arch bridge in Fuling, Chongqing, China. The bridge spans  over the Wu River.

See also
List of longest arch bridge spans

External links
http://www.arch-bridges.com/conf2008/pdf/163.pdf

References

Bridges in Chongqing
Bridges completed in 1989
1989 establishments in China
Arch bridges in China